The Bengali Hindu diaspora is the worldwide population of the Bengali Hindus of Indian and Bangladeshi origin.

History 
In the modern era, the migration of the Bengali Hindus began during the British colonial era. The Bengali Hindus migrants to Assam were mostly government officials, doctors, lawyers, and teachers by profession. They also settled in parts of present Bihar and Jharkhand, which were at the time included in the Presidency of Bengal. After the Partition of India and subsequent incidents of anti-Hindu violence in East Pakistan and Bangladesh (for example, during the 1971 Bangladesh genocide), waves of millions of Bengali Hindu refugees migrated to Assam, Bihar, Jharkhand, Tripura, Orissa, Chhattisgarh, Maharashtra, Uttarakhand and the Andaman and Nicobar Islands. Over the years, professionals migrated from Kolkata to cities like New Delhi, Mumbai, Bangalore and Pune, as well as overseas.

Indian diaspora

Assam 
The Barak Valley comprising the present districts of Cachar, Karimganj and Hailakandi is contiguous to Sylhet (Bengal plains), where the Bengali Hindus, according to historian J.B. Bhattacharjee, had settled well before the colonial period, influencing the culture of Dimasa Kacaharis. Bhattacharjee describes that the Dimasa kings spoke Bengali and the inscriptions and coins written were in Bengali script. Migrations to Cachar increased after the British annexation of the region. The Bengali Hindus settled in Brahmaputra Valley largely during the colonial period as professionals. After the Partition and especially after the genocide of 1950, Bengali Hindus of Sylhet immigrated to the Barak Valley. Later on during the 1971 Bangladesh genocide, thousands of Bengali Hindus took refuge in Assam. The Bengali Hindu organizations estimate that there are approximately 6.5 million Bengali Hindus in the state.
However different sources have varied estimation of Bengali Hindu population in Assam.

Tripura 
The non-tribal population of Tripura, the mostly Bengali-speaking Hindus and Muslims, constitute more than two-thirds of the state's population. The resident and the migrant Bengali population benefitted from the culture and language of the royal house of Tripura thanks to embracement of Hinduism and adoption of Bengali as the state language by the Maharajahs of Tripura much before Indian independence. After the Partition of India and Tripura's accession to the Dominion of India, thousands of Bengali Hindus from eastern Bengal took refuge in Tripura. The influx of the Bengali Hindus increased during the Bangladesh Liberation War, when of Bengali Hindus were massacred in Bangladesh by the Pakistani occupation army. At present there are around 2.2 million Bengali Hindus in Tripura, making them the largest ethnic group in the state, constituting over 60% of the total population.

Worldwide diaspora

Europe
The Bengali Hindus started migrating into the United Kingdom from the colonial times. However, the majority of the immigrants settled in the UK in the latter half of the 20th century mostly with white collar jobs. The exact population of the Bengali Hindus are not maintained in the census records. Project Joshua estimates the Bengali Hindu population of Bangladeshi origin to be around 33,900. It is estimated that in there are more than 30,000 Bengali Hindus in the Greater London area.

In Italy, the Bengali Hindus celebrate Durga Puja in Bologna, Brescia, Rome and Milan. There are around 150 Bengali Hindu families in Paris. The Bengali Hindus began to migrate to Germany in the 1950s and the 1960s.

Notable Bengali Hindus in Europe include British Communist leader Rajani Palme Dutt, German politician Anita Bose Pfaff, German football manager Robin Dutt, and the richest hotelier of Sweden Bicky Chakraborty.

North America
According to the Canadian Encyclopedia the Bengali Hindus began to arrive in Canada as professionals in the 1960s. However, other scholars have put the date in the 1970s. In 1991, there were an estimated 2,000 Bengali Hindus living in Canada, mainly from India. However, after the IT boom in the late 1990s, more and more professionals began to settle in Canada. According to the 2006 census, there are 12,130 Bengali Hindus in Canada. The Bengali Hindus are mostly concentrated in the cities of Toronto, Ottawa, Montreal, Edmonton, Calgary, Vancouver and Halifax.

The earliest Bengali Hindus in the United States were the revolutionaries fighting for Indian independence. They arrived in the first few decades of the twentieth century. Examples include Noni Gopal Bose, the father of Bose Corp's Amar Bose. In 1913, the Bengali Hindu Akhoy Kumar Mozumdar became the second Indian-born person to get U.S. citizenship. Later the citizenship was stripped from him for not being White/Caucasian. In the 1960s, professionals began to settle in the United States. The present Bengali Hindu population is around 47,600. According to the 2006 census, there were around 33,400 Bengali Hindus of Indian origin in the United States.

Asia
The Bengali Hindu diaspora in Asia is distributed in two major regions, South East Asia and the Middle East. India had developed religious and economic ties with South East Asia since the ancient times. This cultural cross exchange took place through the port of Tamralipta in Bengal. In the modern age, the emigration of Bengali Hindus to South East Asia has taken place since the colonial times. Famous Bengali Hindus from Myanmar include H. N. Goshal and Amar Nath, both of whom were foremost and important leaders of the Communist Party of Burma.

Bengali Hindus settled in present-day Myanmar, Singapore and Malaysia since the beginning of the 20th century. A small community of Bengali Hindus numbering around 1,600 live in Thailand. The annual Durga Puja festival is celebrated in Bangkok.

See also 
 States of India by Bengali speakers
 East Bengali refugees
 Hindu diaspora
 Non-resident Indian and person of Indian origin
 Bangladeshi diaspora
 Bengali Hindus in Myanmar

References 

Bengali Hindus